Masdevallia herradurae is a species of orchid native to the Western Cordillera and Central Cordillera of Colombia.

References

External links 

herradurae
Endemic orchids of Colombia